Rüstem Mariani, also known as Rüstem Mariani Pasha, Rüstem Pasha, Rostem Pasha (Ottoman: رستم مارياني باشا) was an Ottoman diplomat, and the third Mutasarrif of Mount Lebanon.

Early life 
Rüstem was born in 1810 in a wealthy, Italian Latin Catholic family in Florence. His paternal lineage is believed to have noble roots, with connections to the Ottoman Empire. Rüstem received quality education, but his father lost the family wealth and died at a young age.

Career

Diplomacy 
Thanks to his mother's connections, Rüstem landed a job with the Ottoman ambassador to Rome, and he became his protégé. He traveled with the ambassador to Istanbul, and obtained the Ottoman citizenship.

Rüstem's quickly advanced in his career at the Ottoman Foreign Ministry. he served as a translator and confidential secretary to various ministries. He was later appointed Ottoman plenipotentiary in Florence and Rome, then ambassador to the Russian Empire in Saint Petersburg.

Governor 
Rüstem was promoted to the rank of vizier and appointed governor of Mount Lebanon by the imperial decrees in 1873 for a term of ten years.

Later years and death 
Rustem was appointed in 1883 as ambassador to London. He died there two years later.

Personal life 
Rüstem never married.

References 

1810 births
19th-century people from the Ottoman Empire
Governors of the Ottoman Empire
1885 deaths